Robert Scott Wilson (born November 9, 1987) is an American model and actor. He is known for portraying the roles of Ben Weston and Alexander "Alex" Kiriakis on Days of Our Lives.

He is also known for being the first male model of The Price Is Right.

Early life
Wilson grew up outside of Boston, Massachusetts. In 2006, he moved to New York after graduating from Grafton Memorial High School.

Career
Wilson appeared in episodes of the television series The Secret Life of the American Teenager and The Middle. He has guest-starred as Colin Kirk in Supah Ninjas and appeared in episodes of Entourage, Melissa and Joey, Greek, Suite Life On Deck and Make It or Break It. He appeared in music videos for Victoria Justice, Manika, Toni Braxton and David Guetta. He has appeared in the feature films Bride Wars, Surrogates, Friends with Benefits and The Social Network.

In August 2012, The Price Is Right began a search for their first permanent male model, and held an open call for auditions. Wilson emerged as one of three finalists after competing with 25 other candidates. He was then voted by viewers of the show to win the model search in September 2012. Wilson appeared on new episodes through the spring of 2014, and mentored candidates for his replacement in the fall of 2014 in the Web series "Male Model Search II".

In 2013, Wilson joined the cast of All My Children for The OnLine Network. His character, Pete Cortlandt, is the youngest son of Opal and Palmer Cortlandt and a 22-year-old Silicon Valley tech wiz.

He also modeled for several brands of underwear. He was formerly signed with Ford Models of Los Angeles. As of January 2014, he is signed with Otto Models and LA Model Management. 

In April 2014, Days of Our Lives announced that Wilson had been hired as a recast for the role of Ben, previously portrayed by Justin Gaston. Wilson vacated the role in December 2015. In January 2016, it was announced that Wilson would reprise his role as Ben in March to facilitate the exit of his former co-star Kate Mansi who played Abigail Deveraux. Wilson concluded his run with the series on June 24, 2016. In July 2017, Wilson was cast in the Rob Malenfant directed thriller, The Girl Who Cried Wolf. Wilson once again returned to Days of Our Lives in September 2017 to help facilitate the return of Chandler Massey's Will Horton. In November 2017, Wilson was cast in the Jared Cohn directed independent film Relic opposite William Shatner. In late 2017, it was announced that he was cast as a regular on Amazon's show Ladies of the Lake season 2 as Ethan Wyatt.

On July 8, 2022, Wilson exited his role as Ben Weston, but returned in a new role as Alexander "Alex" Kiriakis, the son of Justin Kiriakis (Wally Kurth) and Anjelica Deveraux (Judith Chapman) on Days of Our Lives on July 26, 2022.

Filmography

References

External links
 
 

Living people
Male models from Massachusetts
People from Hollywood, Los Angeles
Male actors from Massachusetts
American male television actors
1987 births